Geoffrey Arone is an American blockchain investor and advisor.

Career
Arone is currently a partner at Arrington XRP Capital, a hedge fund focused on crypto assets and blockchain tech.  He has invested in more than 50 cryptocurrency companies since 2017.  Previously, he was Chief Product Officer at Whitepages.  Prior to that, he was Chief Scientist of Experian, which acquired SafetyWeb in May 2011.  Arone co-founded SafetyWeb in June 2009 and raised ~ $8 million from Battery Ventures and First Round Capital.  SafetyWeb is a cloud-based personal security company whose products include SafetyWeb Family and myID.

Prior to SafetyWeb, Arone was the CEO and co-founder of DanceJam with MC Hammer and Anthony Young. While running DanceJam, Arone raised two rounds of venture capital and sold the company to Grind Networks in 2009.

In late 2004, Arone co-founded Flock, the first web browser with social network integration, with Bart Decrem and Anthony Young. In all, Flock raised ~ $28 million from Bessemer Venture Partners, Shasta Ventures, and Fidelity Ventures. Nearly 6 years and 14 million downloads later, Flock was acquired by Zynga.

Education
Arone has also held product positions at RealNetworks, Informatica, and Oracle. He holds a Sc.B. in Neural Science from Brown University and his PhD work was also in Neural Science. He earned an MBA from the MIT Sloan School of Management.

References

Living people
Year of birth missing (living people)
American businesspeople
Place of birth missing (living people)
MIT Sloan School of Management alumni